Millie is a feminine given name or diminutive form of various other given names, such as Emily, Millicent, Mildred, Camille or sometimes Amelia.

People with the given name
Notable people with the given name include:
 Millie Bailey (1918–2022), American World War II veteran, civil servant, and volunteer
Amelia Best (1900–1979), one of the first two women elected to the Tasmanian House of Assembly
 Millie Bobby Brown (born 2004), English actress
 Millie Bright (born 1993), English footballer in the FA Women's Super League
 Millie Corretjer (born 1974), Puerto Rican singer and actress
 Millie Criswell (born 1948), American writer of romance novels
 Millie Davis (born 2006), Canadian actress
 Mildred Millie Deegan (1919–2002), American baseball player in the All-American Girls Professional Baseball League
 Millie DeLeon (c. 1873–1922), stage name of American burlesque dancer Millie Lawrence
 Millie Gamble (1887–1986), Canadian photographer
 Millie Gibson (born 2004), English actress
 Millie Goldsholl (1920–2012), American film director
 Millie Hamner, American politician, member of the Colorado State House of Representatives beginning 2010
 Millie Hughes-Fulford (1945–2021), American medical investigator, molecular biologist and former NASA astronaut
 Millie Innes (born 2000), Scottish actress
 Millie Jackson (born 1944), American singer-songwriter
 Millie Jeffrey (1910–2004), American activist and pioneer for workers', civil and women's rights, and union organizer
 Millie Kirkham (1923–2014), American singer born Millicent Eakes
 Millie Knight (born 1999), British Paralympic skier
 Millie McKoy (1851–1912), African-American conjoined twin
 Millie Peacock, Lady Peacock (1870–1948), first woman elected to the Parliament of Victoria, Australia
 Millie Perkins (born 1938), American actress
 Millie Puente (born 1958), American Latin jazz singer
 Mildred Lewis Rutherford (1851–1928), American educator and author nicknamed "Miss Millie"
 Millie Scott (fl. 1980s), American R&B singer
 Millicent Simmonds (born 2002/2003), deaf actor
 Millie Spalding (born 1998), British acrobatic gymnast
 Millie Small (1947–2020), Jamaican singer-songwriter
 Millie Tomlinson (born 1992), English professional squash player

Fictional characters with the given name
 the title character of Meet Millie, a radio and television series of the 1950s
 the title character of Millie the Model, a comic book series
 Millie (Suikoden), in the video game Suikoden 2
 Millie the Echidna, one of the three official mascots of the 2000 Summer Olympic Games in Sydney
 Millie Dillmount, title character of the 1967 film Thoroughly Modern Millie and the 2002 Broadway musical
 Millie Frock, a character in Bob's Burgers
 Millicent Huxtable, in the television series One Tree Hill
 Millie Mouse, in the Mickey Mouse universe
 Millie, a principal character in the web series Helluva Boss
 Millicent Mudd, a character in the webcomic Ozy and Millie
 Millie Rusk, in the science-fiction comedy Free Guy
 Millicent Millie Tant, in the British comic Viz
 Millie, a character in Helluva Boss

See also

 Milly, another feminine given name

Feminine given names
English feminine given names
Hypocorisms